Roger was  the fourth Archdeacon of Barnstaple.

References

Archdeacons of Barnstaple